The Jackson Rooming House, also known as Jackson House, is a historic building constructed in 1901 as a boarding house in the city of Tampa, in the U.S. state of Florida. It provided accommodations to African-Americans and other travelers of African descent during the era of racial segregation. It is located on the north end of downtown at 851 Zack Street, approximately one block west of Tampa Union Station. On March 7, 2007, it was added to the U.S. National Register of Historic Places (NRHP).

The Jackson Rooming House was one of the only places in Tampa where black travelers could find lodging, as they were not accepted in standard hotels of the day.  The 24-room establishment began as a six-room cottage built by Moses and Sarah Jackson in 1901.  Soon after, they added bedrooms and a second story in order to operate the rooming house, which remained in business until 1989.  The Jacksons' children inherited the business and the home remains in the possession of one of the Jacksons' grandchildren.

During its time the Jackson House played host to several prominent entertainers, including Count Basie, Cab Calloway, James Brown, Ella Fitzgerald, and Ray Charles.  Acts such as these would come to play the nightclubs of Tampa's black business district, which thrived nearby along Central Avenue until the 1960s.

During the urban renewal of the 1970s most of the neighborhood surrounding the house was razed.  By 2007, when the house was added to the NRHP, the Jackson House was believed to be the last free-standing residential dwelling in downtown Tampa.

In 2013, the Jackson House was deemed too damaged to be restored and faced likely demolition. In 2013, efforts were being made to save the historic Rooming House from demolition by the City of Tampa.  As of January 13, 2014, Todd Alan Clem, commonly known as Bubba the Love Sponge, planned to purchase this property and begin the restoration of the house. Soon afterwards, Clem withdrew plans blaming mayor Bob Buckhorn and city officials.  The Jackson House Foundation estimates that it will cost about a million dollars to restore the building.

References

External links 
 The Jackson House Foundation

Houses on the National Register of Historic Places in Hillsborough County, Florida
Houses in Tampa, Florida
National Register of Historic Places in Tampa, Florida
African-American history of Florida
Vernacular architecture in Florida
1901 establishments in Florida
Houses completed in 1901